Lester Archer (1838 – October 27, 1864) was an American soldier who received the Medal of Honor for valor during the American Civil War.

Biography
Archer enlisted in the Army from Fort Edward, New York in December 1861, and was promoted to Sergeant in June 1864. He was posthumously awarded the Medal of Honor on April 6, 1865 for his actions at the Battle of Fair Oaks & Darbytown Road.

Medal of Honor citation
Citation:

Gallantry in placing the colors of his regiment on the fort.

See also

List of American Civil War Medal of Honor recipients: A-F

References

External links

Military Times

1838 births
1864 deaths
Union Army non-commissioned officers
United States Army Medal of Honor recipients
People of New York (state) in the American Civil War
People from Fort Ann, New York
American Civil War recipients of the Medal of Honor
Union military personnel killed in the American Civil War
Burials in Warren County, New York